Can-Can is a 1960 American musical film made by Suffolk-Cummings productions and distributed by 20th Century Fox. It was directed by Walter Lang, produced by Jack Cummings and Saul Chaplin. The screenplay was written by Dorothy Kingsley and Charles Lederer, loosely based on the musical play by Abe Burrows. The music and lyrics were written by Cole Porter for the play, but for the film, some songs were replaced by those from earlier Porter musicals. Art direction was handled by Jack Martin Smith and Lyle R. Wheeler, costume design by Irene Sharaff and dance staging by Hermes Pan. The film was photographed in Todd-AO. Although performing well on initial release, it failed to recoup its production costs from its domestic receipts.

The film stars Frank Sinatra, Shirley MacLaine, Maurice Chevalier and Louis Jourdan, and gave Juliet Prowse her first speaking role in a feature. Sinatra, who was paid $200,000 along with a percentage of the film's profits, acted in the film under a contractual obligation required by 20th Century Fox after he had walked off the set of Carousel in 1955.

Plot
In the Montmartre district of Paris, a dance known as the can-can, considered lewd, is performed nightly at the Bal du Paradis, a cabaret where Simone Pistache is both a dancer and the proprietor. On a night when her lawyer and lover François Durnais brings his good friend chief magistrate Paul Barrière to the café, a raid is staged by police and Claudine and the other dancers are placed under arrest and brought before the court.
 
Paul wishes the charges to be dismissed, but his younger colleague Philippe Forrestier believes that the laws against public indecency should be enforced. Visiting the café and pretending to be someone else in order to gain evidence, Philippe becomes acquainted with Simone and develops a romantic interest in her, but she is warned by Claudine that he is actually a judge.

Despite his attraction to her, Philippe proceeds with again raiding the café, and Simone is arrested. François attempts to blackmail Philippe with a compromising photograph in an effort to force him to drop the charges. However, Philippe had already decided to stop the case. He then shocks Simone by proposing marriage to her. When François comes to visit her, she warns him that she will accept the proposal if he does not marry her himself, but he refuses the notion of ever marrying. Meanwhile, Paul tries dissuade Philippe from the marriage, believing such an arrangement would end his career, but Philippe ignores his advice. Conspiring to sabotage the engagement, Paul arranges a party for the couple aboard a riverboat, during which François gets Simone drunk and encourages her to perform a bawdy routine in front of the upper-class guests. Humiliated, Simone jumps off the boat and refuses to see Philippe again, writing to him that she cannot in good conscience become his bride.

Simone obtains a loan from François to stage a ball, insisting he accept the deed to the café as collateral. On the night of the ball, Simone gets her revenge by arranging for the police to raid the café and arrest François, now the legal proprietor. At the ensuing trial, Simone is called to testify but does not have the heart to give evidence against François. As the case is to be dismissed for lack of evidence, the president of a local moral league demands that action must be taken against the lewd performance. Paul suggests that the court view the dance firsthand to determine that it is indeed indecent. A can-can is performed to the approval of all, who agree that it is not obscene. When the police nonetheless escort Simone to a jail wagon, she is startled to find François inside, and even more surprised when he finally proposes.

Songs
The film contains what critics now consider some of Cole Porter's most enduring songs, including "I Love Paris," "It's All Right With Me" and "C'est Magnifique." However, when the musical play premiered in 1953, many critics complained that Porter was producing material far below his usual standard. Some of the songs from the original Broadway musical were replaced by other more famous Porter songs for the film, including "Let's Do It," "Just One of Those Things" and "You Do Something to Me." "I Love Paris" is sung by the chorus over the opening credits rather than in the actual story by MacLaine. A version of "I Love Paris" by Sinatra and Chevalier was featured on the film's soundtrack album, but it was cut in previews when the studio realized that it slowed the film down. A photo of the sequence can be found in a New York Times Magazine article from February 21, 1960. The song takes place shortly after Act Two opens, in the scene in which Chevalier visits Sinatra in a nightclub.

• "I Love Paris" – Sung by chorus over the beginning credits and end screen 

• "Montmart'" – Sung by Frank Sinatra, Maurice Chevalier and chorus 

• "Maidens Typical of France" – Performed by Juliet Prowse and can-can girls 

• "Can-Can" – Danced by Juliet Prowse and can-can girls;  Reprised in the finale by Shirley MacLaine, Prowse, can-can girls and male dancers 

• "C'est Magnifique" – Performed by Frank Sinatra;  Reprised by Shirley MacLaine 

• "Apache Dance" – Danced by Shirley MacLaine and male dancers 

• "Live and Let Live" – Sung by Maurice Chevalier and Louis Jourdan 

• "You Do Something to Me" – Sung by Louis Jourdan 

• "Let's Do It, Let's Fall in Love" – Performed by Frank Sinatra and Shirley MacLaine 

• "It's All Right with Me" – Sung by Frank Sinatra;  Reprised by Louis Jourdan 

• "Come Along with Me" – Performed by Shirley MacLaine 

• "Just One of Those Things" – Sung by Maurice Chevalier 

• "Garden of Eden Ballet" (interpolating portions of "I Love Paris") – Danced by Shirley MacLaine, Juliet Prowse, Marc Wilder and dancers

Plot alterations
The plot of the musical was revised for the film adaptation. In the stage version, the judge is the leading character, but in the film, it is the lover of the nightclub owner who is the lead, and the judge forms the other half of a love triangle not found in the play. The character of Paul Barriere, a non-singing supporting part on stage, was enhanced and given two songs for Maurice Chevalier .

Soviet Propaganda controversy

During the filming, Soviet premier Nikita Khrushchev famously visited the 20th Century Fox studios and was allegedly shocked by what he saw. He took the opportunity to make propagandistic use of his visit and described the dance, and by extension American culture, as "depraved" and "pornographic."

Cast
 Frank Sinatra as François Durnais, a shyster lawyer
 Shirley MacLaine as Simone Pistache, nightclub proprietress
 Maurice Chevalier as Paul Barriere, Senior Judge
 Louis Jourdan as Philippe Forrestiere, Junior Judge
 Juliet Prowse as Claudine, can-can dancer

Reception
In a contemporary review for The New York Times, critic Bosley Crowther lamented the film's deviations from the musical play: "The music has been reduced to snatches, the book has been weirdly changed and the dances–well, they have been abandoned for some tired jigs ..." He, as a nonchalant young lawyer, and she, as the owner of a cabaret that is frequently being raided because they do the can-can there, behave, under Walter Lang's direction, as if they were companions in a Hoboken bar, slightly intoxicated and garrulous with gags. The experience of watching and listening to two such people would probably be about as amusing as watching and listening to Mr. Sinatra and Miss MacLaine."

The film was listed by Variety as the highest-grossing film of 1960 (behind 1959's Ben-Hur) with estimated rentals of $10 million, based on an estimated $3 million from 70-mm showings to December 1960 and $7 million estimated from future 35-mm showings. The expected future rentals were not achieved, and the rental was revised down to $4.2 million the following year.

Awards and nominations

Academy Awards, 1961:
 Nominated – Best Costume Design
 Nominated – Best Scoring of a Musical Film

Golden Globe Awards, 1961:'
 Nominated – Best Motion Picture, Musical

Grammy Awards, 1961:
 Winner – Best Motion Picture Soundtrack

References
Notes

External links

1960 films
1960 musical films
American musical films
1960s English-language films
20th Century Fox films
Films set in Paris
Films directed by Walter Lang
Films based on musicals
Films scored by Cole Porter
Films scored by Nelson Riddle
Films with screenplays by Charles Lederer
1960s American films
English-language musical films